Dagfinn Olsen is a Norwegian orienteering competitor. He won a bronze medal in the relay event at the 1966 World Orienteering Championships in Fiskars together with Ola Skarholt, Åge Hadler and Stig Berge, and placed fourth in the individual contest.

References

Year of birth missing (living people)
Living people
Norwegian orienteers
Male orienteers
Foot orienteers
World Orienteering Championships medalists
20th-century Norwegian people